Helmut Degen (born 14 January 1911 in Aglasterhausen – died 2 October 1995 in Trossingen) was a German composer.

Degen studied composition with Wilhelm Maler and Philipp Jarnach; and score and instrumentation with Ernst Gernot Klussmann at the Rheinische Musikschule in Cologne and the University of Bonn, writing his dissertation on Baroque librettist Friedrich Christian Bressand. He later taught theory at the Duisburg Conservatory and later at the Hochschule für Musikerziehung in Trossingen, becoming a professor in 1954.

His works include educational chamber music in modern style. His style resembles Hindemith and uses methods similar to 12-tone composition.

Selected works
 Concerto for organ and orchestra (1938)
 Sonata for viola and piano (1940); Willy Müller, Süddeutscher Musikverlag
 Kleine Weihnachtsmusik (Short Christmas Music) for strings and woodwinds (1942); P. J. Tonger
 Der flanderische Narr, Ballet (1942)
 Kleines Konzert (Short Concerto) for violin and chamber orchestra (1944–1945)
 Kammersinfonie (Chamber Symphony) for small orchestra (1947); Schott
 Konzert Etüden (Concert Etudes) (1948); Schott
 Suter, Oratorio (1950)
 Unisono-Stücke for violin, or viola, or cello solo, or unison ensemble (1950); Heinrichshofen's Verlag
 Stück from Die grosse Reihe for viola solo (1954); Willy Müller, Süddeutscher Musikverlag
 Handbuch der Formenlehre: Grundsätzliches zur musikalischen Formung (1957); Bosse
 10 Stücke (10 Pieces) for violin and viola; Willy Müller, Süddeutscher Musikverlag
 Johannes-Passion for soprano, tenor and chorus a cappella (1961–1962)
 Sonata for flute and viola (1963); N. Simrock
 Capriccio for accordion and cello (1970)
 Genesis-Offenbarung, Oratorio (1973)
 Metamorphosen for cello and piano (1980)
 Concerto for 12 cellos (1982)
 Capriccio scherzando for piano
 Serenade for string orchestra
 String quintet for 2 violins, 2 violas and cello
 String quintet for 2 violins, viola and 2 cellos
 String sextet for 2 violins, 2 violas and 2 cellos
 String quartet

References

 Laux Musik und Musiker der Gegenwart (Essen 1949) pp. 57–64

1911 births
1995 deaths
20th-century German composers